John Horvat (died on 15 August 1394) was a Croato–Hungarian nobleman in the Kingdom of Hungary-Croatia who served as Ban of Macsó from 1376 to 1381, and again between 1385 and 1386.

Horvat was the brother of Ladislaus and Paul, Bishop of Zagreb, and nephew of John of Palisna. Together with his uncle, Horvat led the uprising against Queen Mary and her mother and regent, Elizabeth of Bosnia. He assisted King Charles III of Naples in deposing Mary and assuming the Hungarian crown in late 1385. Queen Elizabeth soon had Charles murdered. In 1386, Horvat and his uncle captured the queens in Gorjani and imprisoned them. Elizabeth was strangled on the orders of Horvat's uncle, while Mary was eventually released by her husband, Sigismund of Luxembourg, who had recently been crowned king of Hungary. Horvat's ally was Elizabeth's first cousin, King Tvrtko I of Bosnia, who appointed him and his brothers governors of Usora. Horvat himself was also granted the city of Omiš by King Tvrtko. However, Tvrtko died in 1391 and three years later, Horvat was captured by King Sigismund. Sigismund and Mary then avenged her mother's death by having Horvat brutally executed in Pécs on 15 August 1394.

References 

|-

John
Medieval Croatian nobility
Medieval Hungarian nobility
Bans of Macsó
14th-century Croatian military personnel
1394 deaths
Year of birth unknown
People executed by Hungary
Executed Croatian people
Executed Hungarian people

14th-century Croatian nobility